Nokomis  is a town in the Canadian province of Saskatchewan.

Demographics 

History

1904: The area was opened up to homesteading.
1906: Florence Mary Halstead established a post office on the Halstead farm and called it "Nokomis". After the Grand Trunk Pacific Railway was built, the town requested the post office be moved into town, accepting the condition of the post-mistress that the town be renamed "Nokomis". The post office was first located in Henry's Men's Clothing Store, and moved into its own building just north of the Times Office the next year.
1907: The town was named Junction City, with the hopes that it would become the largest city in western Canada
1907: The Canadian Bank of Commerce was constructed with K.W. Reikie as manager, and the Northern Crown Bank with R.S. Inkster as manager. Inkster's residence (Earl McDougall's house) was one of the first residences constructed. Others were homes of Norman Townsend and J.I. Jamieson. Ewart's hall opened above the Northern Crown Bank, and here the first schoolroom classes were held. Mabel Dobbyn, who later married K.W. Reikie of the Bank of Commerce, was the first teacher.
1908: Carloads of lumber, hardware and carpenters were arriving, and the Sash and Door Factory was kept busy. For a time the Franklin Realty Co. contemplated starting a brickyard, using the good clay of the district. Almost every train brought in new settlers, and many cars of settlers' effects. That month, the Nokomis Times building was put up on 2nd Avenue by W.C.R. Garrioch.
1908: The town was renamed Nokomis
1909: The post office was opened
1910: The Carter Land Company began purchasing land in the Nokomis district.
1912: The first coal seam was discovered south east of Nokomis in the Tate area (now known as the NSC1 Pit) (51.43935N,-104.819276W).
1914–1916: Two more mines were started, one  (NCS2) and the other straight east(NCS3).
1946: After the Second World War many men returned to the area where they found work with a new oil company from the United States (ND Oil Seekers)
1947: The first well was drilled, which is known as NOW1 (Nokomis Oil Well 1).  It was drilled in the formation known as the Hatfield Basin (Latitude: 51° 25' 26.117" N, Longitude: 105° 00' 47.486" W). The Hatfield Basin was mainly sweet crude oil and was extremely shallow.  This made the area very popular to new oil companies.
1988: The first horizontal well was drilled in the area by the directional driller Ryan Oliver and MWD was done by Kent Ruether.  This well broke many records.  It was one of the fastest ever drilled, the longest ever drilled and had the best production upon completion (this record still has not been beaten).
1998: the Saskatchewan Provincial Rifle Association purchased land 6-miles east of Nokomis (NE 34-31-22 West of the 2nd) to re-open an abandoned rifle range now known as North Star Range.  The SPRA operate it as a club facility where competitors can practice long range shooting target shooting from measured firing points back to 1665-yds.
2008: Nokomis had its 100th anniversary

Climate

Notable people
 Max Braithwaite, author
 James Francis Edwards, RCAF pilot and WW2 ace
 Jordan Hendry, NHL player
Elmer Lach, former NHL player and Hall of Famer (inducted 1966)
 Kenny Shields (1947-2017), lead singer, Streetheart

See also 
 List of communities in Saskatchewan
List of place names in Canada of Indigenous origin
 List of towns in Saskatchewan

References

Wreford No. 280, Saskatchewan
Towns in Saskatchewan
Division No. 11, Saskatchewan